Patrick Wisdom O'Neal (September 26, 1927 – September 9, 1994) was an American actor and restaurateur.

Early life
O'Neal was born in Ocala, Florida, to Martha and Coke Wisdom O'Neal. He attended the Riverside Military Academy in Gainesville, Georgia, and Ocala High School. Upon graduation, he enrolled at the University of Florida in Gainesville where he majored in drama. During college, O'Neal joined the Florida Players, a theatre troupe. He was also a member of the Sigma Alpha Epsilon fraternity and was the editor of the university yearbook. After earning a bachelor's degree, O'Neal enlisted in the United States Air Force and served during the Korean War. During the war, he directed short training films. After 15 months' service, he moved to New York and studied at the Actors Studio and Neighborhood Playhouse.

Career
O'Neal was seen mostly as a guest star on television throughout four decades, beginning in the 1950s. In the early 1960s, he received critical praise for his leading role on Broadway in Tennessee Williams' The Night of the Iguana, but the starring role for the 1964 film version went to Richard Burton. In 1969, he had a leading role in John Huston's The Kremlin Letter and a supporting role in the western El Condor. He appeared in the 1973 hit The Way We Were. In 1972, he portrayed a murderous architect in the Columbo episode "Blueprint for Murder" and in 1978, on the same show, he played a television network executive in the episode "Make Me a Perfect Murder". In 1990, he played the corrupt Police Commissioner Kevin Quinn in Sidney Lumet's Q&A.

With his wife and his brother Michael, O'Neal co-owned a number of successful restaurants beginning in 1963, including "The Ginger Man" on West 64th St. (later renamed O'Neal's); "O'Neal's" on West 57th St., briefly the flagship of an O'Neal's chain; "The Landmark Tavern" on 11th Avenue; and “O’Neal’s Saloon” at West 63rd St. and Columbus Ave., soon retitled "O'Neal's Baloon" (because the word “Saloon” had been outlawed during Prohibition but the neon sign for Saloon had already been created). All were located on the West Side of Manhattan.

Personal life
O'Neal married actress Cynthia Baxter in 1956. They had two sons, Maximilian and Fitzjohn, and remained married until O'Neal's death.

Death
O'Neal died on September 9, 1994, of respiratory failure at Saint Vincent's Catholic Medical Center in Manhattan, 17 days short of his 67th birthday. At the time of his death, he was also suffering from lung cancer and tuberculosis.

Broadway credits
 A Far Country (April–November 1961)
The Night of the Iguana (December 1961 – September 1962)

Selected filmography

Films

 The Mad Magician (1954) - Lt. Alan Bruce
 The Black Shield of Falworth (1954) - Walter Blunt
 From the Terrace (1960) - Dr. Jim Roper
 A Matter of Morals (1961) - Alan Kennebeck
 The Cardinal (1963) - Cecil Turner
 In Harm's Way (1965) - Commander Neal Owynn
 King Rat (1965) - Max
 A Fine Madness (1966) - Dr. Oliver West
 Alvarez Kelly (1966) - Major Albert Stedman
 Chamber of Horrors (1966) - Jason Cravatte (aka Jason Caroll)
 Matchless (1967) - Perry 'Matchless' Liston
 Assignment to Kill (1968) - Richard Cutting
 Where Were You When the Lights Went Out? (1968) - Peter Garrison
 The Secret Life of an American Wife (1968) - Tom Layton
 Castle Keep (1969) - Capt. Lionel Beckman
 Stiletto (1969) - George Baker
 The Kremlin Letter (1970) - Charles Rone
 El Condor (1970) - Chavez
 Corky (1972) - Randy
 Silent Night, Bloody Night (1972) - John Carter
 The Way We Were (1973) - George Bissinger
 To Kill the King (1974) - David Howard
 The Stepford Wives (1975) - Dale Coba
 The Stuff (1985) - Fletcher
 Like Father Like Son (1987) - Dr. Larry Armbruster
 New York Stories (1989) - Phillip Fowler (segment: "Life Lessons")
 Q & A (1990) - Kevin Quinn
 Alice (1990) - Alice's Father
 For the Boys (1991) - Shephard
 Under Siege (1992) - Captain Adams

Television

 The Pepsi-Cola Playhouse (1 episode, 1954) 
 Appointment with Adventure (2 episodes, 1955-1956)
 Dick and the Duchess (25 episodes, 1957-1958) - Dick Starrett
 One Step Beyond (1 episode, 1959) - Mitchell Campion
 Diagnosis: Unknown (3 episodes, 1960) - Dr. Daniel Coffee
 The Millionaire (episode: “The Story of Elizabeth Tander”, 1960) - David Stevens 
 Naked City (1 episode, 1962) - Roy Pressfield
 The Twilight Zone (episode: "A Short Drink from a Certain Fountain", 1963) - Harmon Gordon
 Alfred Hitchcock Hour (1 episode, 1964) - George Maxwell
 Route 66 (1 episode, 1963: "Same Picture, Different Frame", - Eric 
 Outer Limits (episode: "Wolf 359", 1964) - Jonathan Meridith
 Night Gallery (1 episode, 1971) - Justus Walters (segment: "A Fear of Spiders")
 McCloud  (2 episodes, 1971-1972) - Alex Demarest / Arthur Yerby 
 Columbo (2 episodes, 1972-1978) - Frank Flanagan / Elliot Markham
 Cannon (1 episode, 1972) - Arlo Hemming
 Marcus Welby M.D. (1 episode, 1972) - Dr. Valentine Peterson
 The Doris Day Show (3 episodes, 1972-1973) - Jonathan Rusk
 Barnaby Jones (3 episodes, 1973-1976) - Coleman Reeves / Frank Cabot / Charles Manly Wheeling
 Thriller (1 episode, 1974) - Michael Lane
 The Moneychangers (miniseries, 1976) - Harold Austin
 Kaz (23 episodes, 1978-1979) - Samuel Bennett
 Emerald Point N.A.S. (9 episodes, 1983) - Harlan Adams
 Tales of the Unexpected (1 episode, 1984) - Sutton
 Murder, She Wrote (1 episode, 1985) - Si Parrish
 Perry Mason Returns (television movie, 1985) - Arthur Gordon
 Maigret (television movie, 1988) - Kevin Portman
 Perry Mason: The Case of the Skin-Deep Scandal (television movie, 1993) - Arthur Westbrook (final film role)

References

External links

Patrick O'Neal at the University of Wisconsin's Actors Studio audio collection

University of Florida alumni
1927 births
1994 deaths
20th-century American male actors
American male film actors
American male stage actors
American male television actors
American restaurateurs
Deaths from respiratory failure
Male actors from Florida
People from Ocala, Florida
20th-century American businesspeople
United States Air Force personnel of the Korean War